Burkina Faso started vaccinating against COVID-19 on 2 June 2021.

Background

Vaccines On Order 
Burkina Faso is in the works of securing additional vaccines.

History

Timeline

March 2021 
So far, the health system in Burkina Faso's health system has been under strain with dealing with the pandemic, leaving them unable to focus on vaccinations in the country.

May 2021 
Burkina Faso received 115,200 doses of the Oxford–AstraZeneca COVID-19 vaccine on 30 May, courtesy of COVAX.

June 2021 
Vaccinations started on 2 June. By the end of the month 25,833 vaccine doses had been administered.

July 2021 
In late July and early August, Burkina Faso received 302,400 doses of the Janssen COVID-19 vaccine donated by the United States through COVAX. By the end of the month 35,402 vaccine doses had been administered.

August 2021 
By the end of the month 98,670 vaccine doses had been administered.

September 2021 
By the end of the month 254,545 vaccine doses had been administered.

October 2021 
By the end of the month 393,427 vaccine doses had been administered while 3% of the targeted population had been fully vaccinated.

November 2021 
By the end of the month 490,477 vaccine doses had been administered while 4% of the targeted population had been fully vaccinated.

December 2021 
By the end of the month 1.05 million vaccine doses had been administered while 8% of the targeted population had been fully vaccinated.

January 2022 
By the end of the month 1.3 million vaccine doses had been administered while 9% of the targeted population had been fully vaccinated.

February 2022 
By the end of the month 2.3 million vaccine doses had been administered while 1.1 million persons had been fully vaccinated.

March 2022 
By the end of the month 2.4 million vaccine doses had been administered while 1.2 million persons had been fully vaccinated.

April 2022 
By the end of the month 2.9 million vaccine doses had been administered while 1.5 million persons had been fully vaccinated.

Progress 
Cumulative vaccinations

References 

Burkina Faso
Vaccination
Burkina Faso